Alborghetti is an Italian surname. Notable people with the surname include:

Lisa Alborghetti (born 1993), Italian women's footballer
Luiz Carlos Alborghetti (1945–2009), Brazilian radio personality and conservative commentator
Mario Alborghetti (1928–1955), Italian racing driver

Italian-language surnames